"I Don't Even Know Your Name" is a song co-written and recorded by American country music artist Alan Jackson. It was released in May 1995 as the fifth and final single from his album Who I Am. It reached number-one on the U.S. Billboard country charts and on the Canadian RPM Country Tracks chart. It was written by Jackson with Ron Jackson and Andy Lofton.

Background and writing
Alan Jackson commented that the song was written as a joke by request of some family members. While on tour in 1993, he decided to write it and record it. After he gave the demo tape to his brother in-law, everybody wanted to hear the song so he put it on Who I Am.

Content
The song begins with a man who is "sitting at a roadhouse." As his waitress, who noticeably has a missing left front tooth, takes his order, another waitress at the roadhouse catches his eye. Over the course of the song, the singer falls in love with the other waitress, winds up intoxicated, blacks out, and comes to his senses in the middle of his own wedding; as it turns out, he has now been unwittingly married to the waitress with the missing tooth. All the while, none of the three characters know each other's names.

Music video
The video for "I Don't Even Know Your Name" starred comedian Jeff Foxworthy as the song's male character.

Chart positions
"I Don't Even Know Your Name" debuted at number 75 on the  U.S. Billboard Hot Country Singles & Tracks for the week of May 13, 1995.

Year-end charts

References

1995 singles
Alan Jackson songs
Songs written by Alan Jackson
Song recordings produced by Keith Stegall
Arista Nashville singles
1994 songs